The Venerable Shin Uttarajīva (died c. 5 October 1191) was Primate of  Pagan Kingdom during the reigns of three kings Narathu, Naratheinkha and Narapatisithu from 1167 to 1191. The Theravada Buddhist monk presided over the realignment of Burmese Buddhism with the Mahavihara school of Ceylon, away from the Conjeveram-Thaton school of Shin Arahan.

History
The primate, who was of Mon descent, and a group of Burmese monks visited Ceylon on a religious mission in 1180. (Some Sri Lankan sources state the year of the visit was more likely circa 1171-1173.) He also brought a few young monks, including a 19-year-old Shin Chapata. Over the course of visit, Shin Uttarajiva decided to realign Burmese Theravada Buddhism, which probably came from Conjeveram in South India via Thaton, to the Mahavihara school. The returning monks refused to accept the validity of Thaton-Buddhism ordination.

The quarrel became a schism: those who derived their ordination from Shin Arahan were known as the Former Order; those who derived it from Ceylon were known as the Latter Order. The king supported the new movement. More and more monks were sent to Ceylon where they received ordination at the ancient Mahavihara Monastery.  Shin Uttarajiva died in October 1191 (right around the end of Buddhist Lent). By then, the Mahavihara school became the predominant school of Burmese Buddhism. Shin Chapata also returned from Ceylon right after his teacher's death, and carried on his teacher's reformation effort. But the old order did not yield easily. The schism lasted two centuries before Conjeveram Buddhism finally died out.

Shin Uttarajiva was succeeded by Shin Siha Maha Upali as primate.

References

Bibliography
 
 
 
 

Theravada Buddhist monks
Burmese Buddhist monks
Pagan dynasty
Burmese people of Mon descent
Year of death unknown
Year of birth unknown
12th-century Burmese people